The World According to Paris is an American reality television series focusing on the daily life of Paris Hilton. It aired on Oxygen from June 1, to July 20, 2011. On August 23, 2011, it was announced that Oxygen did not renew the series for a second season.

Overview
The World According to Paris focuses on Hilton's daily life as well as her relationships with family, friends and then-boyfriend Cy Waits. It also features her court-ordered community service stemming from her arrest in Las Vegas, Nevada for cocaine possession and the planning of her 30th birthday party.

Cast
Paris Hilton 
Brooke Mueller 
Lexi Dreyfus
Jennifer Rovero
Allison Melnick
Brooke Brinson (daughter of Kim Richards)
Cy Waits (Hilton's then-boyfriend)
Kathy Hilton

Production
On September 30, 2010, it was announced that Oxygen had greenlighted a reality television series revolving around Paris Hilton. The project was produced by A. Smith & Co. Productions. Arthur Smith, Kent Weed, Paris Hilton, Richard Hilton and Jamie Freed served as executive producers. Filming took place from November 2010 to February 2011. On August 23, 2011, Oxygen cancelled the series after its first season.

Episodes

Reception

Critical response
Entertainment Weekly gave the series a "D", stating that, unlike Keeping Up with the Kardashians, it "fails to deliver any frothy fun and the star comes across as completely unlikable". Alessandra Stanley of The New York Times writes that Paris comes off as "a Sony Walkman in an iPod era, a Friendster in the age of Facebook." Brian Lowry of Variety writes the show reeks of hypocrisy: "Paris laments how the paparazzi intrude on her life, and then she allows a camera crew to watch her bathe", and sticks to her "old tricks" like "showing up for court-ordered community service in Louboutin high heels." Melissa Coleman of The Shizz writes that Hilton's attempt to be seen as a serious businesswoman backfires: "If Hilton thinks that insulting her friends, whining to her boyfriend to get her way, and refusing to lift a finger will portray her as a serious businesswoman, she's delusional." Radio personality Howard Stern called it  "the greatest reality show I ever saw because I've never seen a human being so devoid of any humanity. There is nothing in Paris Hilton that indicates that there's a heart or a soul; she is, I said, vomitous." Hilton and her mother later requested to appear on The Howard Stern Show but backed out afterwards; Stern speculated that they asked for the interview upon hearing that he called it his favorite reality show, then learned of the context in which he said it and rescinded the offer.

Viewership
The series' eight-week run averaged only 293,000 viewers and a 0.2 rating among adults 18-49, making it Oxygen's least-watched series of 2011.

References

External links
 

2010s American reality television series
2011 American television series debuts
2011 American television series endings
English-language television shows
Oxygen (TV channel) original programming
Paris Hilton